Martin Sloboda (born 2 October 1990) is a Slovak professional ice hockey forward currently playing for HK 36 Skalica in the Slovak Extraliga.

References

External links

1990 births
Living people
HC Slovan Bratislava players
HK 36 Skalica players
Slovak ice hockey forwards
Ice hockey people from Bratislava
Slovak expatriate ice hockey players in the Czech Republic